Borxhliu is a 1999 Albanian TV drama film directed and written by Arian Çuliqi. The film starred Sejfulla Myftari, Aleko Prodani, and Hajrie Rondo.

External links
 
 
 https://shqip.info/borxhliu/

1999 films
1999 drama films
Albanian-language films
Albanian drama films